The 2021 Lithuanian Athletics Championships was the 98th edition of the national championship in outdoor track and field for athletes in Lithuania. It was held between 25 and 26 June at the Palangos centrinis stadionas in Palanga.

Results 
Source:

Men

Women

References

External links 
Lithuanian Athletics Association website 

Lithuanian Athletics Championships
Athletics
Lithuanian Athletics Championships